On November 12, 2022, two World War II-era aircraft, a B-17 Flying Fortress and a Bell P-63 Kingcobra, collided mid-air and crashed during the Wings Over Dallas airshow at Dallas Executive Airport in Dallas, Texas, United States. The collision occurred at 1:22p.m. local time (CST, UTC−6). The airshow, which coincided with Veterans Day commemorations, was organized by the Commemorative Air Force.

Officials reported that the B-17 had a crew of five while the P-63 had a single occupant; all six were confirmed by the Dallas County Medical Examiner to have died. Both aircraft were destroyed on impact.

Aircraft 
The B-17 involved was Texas Raiders, a Douglas-Long Beach built B-17G-95-DL, aircraft registration number N7227C, which first entered service in 1945 and was operated by American Airpower Heritage Flying Museum. It was one of the few surviving B-17 Flying Fortress aircraft that remained airworthy.

The second aircraft involved was a P-63F-1-BE Kingcobra registered N6763, which was also operated by American Airpower Heritage Flying Museum. This plane was one of only two P-63F variants ever built and was one of only five P-63s that remained airworthy. It did not have a name and was painted in its original "X" test markings, originally used as reference points for tracking purposes.

Crash 
The crash occurred at the Dallas Executive Airport during an airshow that had drawn more than 4,000 spectators. Both aircraft were typically piloted by highly trained volunteers, in many cases retired professional pilots. Texas Raiders was the lead aircraft of a five-bomber formation, and the P-63F was the third aircraft of a three-fighter formation.

The apparent intent, from a pilot observing the action from the ground, was to execute single-ship passes. According to witness accounts, the P-63F was performing a high-speed descending banked turn onto the runway approach. It collided with the B-17 on the rear port quarter from above, severing the B-17's fuselage from a point just aft of its wings. Both aircraft broke apart and hit the ground seconds afterward, exploding and erupting into flames.

A pilot witnessing the mid-air collision from the ground has speculated the P-63F pilot may have mis-identified one of the trailing bombers as the leader, causing him to assume he had already cleared the flight path of the bomber formation. This in turn led him to tighten his line and assume an attitude with the P-63F's belly towards the bomber line, leaving him blind to the approaching B-17.

Victims 
All six crew members on board both aircraft were killed. No injuries or fatalities were reported on the ground. It was the Commemorative Air Force's first fatal accident in 17 years.

The five fatalities aboard the B-17 were Terry Barker, Kevin "K5" Michels, Dan Ragan, Leonard "Len" Root, and Curtis J. Rowe. Craig Hutain was identified as the sole pilot of the Bell P-63.

Terry Barker was a former American Airlines pilot for 36 years, a former Army helicopter pilot, and former city council member in Keller, Texas. Craig Hutain, the sole pilot and fatality aboard the Bell P-63, had started flying solo at the age of 17 and was a former commercial pilot for United Airlines and Rocky Mountain Airways. Hutain started flying as a child with his father, a World War II veteran, and had been a pilot for the Tora! Tora! Tora! airshow, a reenactment of the bombing of Pearl Harbor, at the time of his death. Kevin "K5" Michels, the youngest of the deceased, was an active member of the Commemorative Air Force acting as historian, media representative, and tour supervisor for the organization. Len Root was a retired commercial pilot who had flown for American Airlines for nearly four decades. Dan Ragan was a Korean War veteran who served as a radio operator in the 1950s on the naval variant of the B-17, which was designated PB-1W. He lived in Dallas and was a native of Tulsa, Oklahoma. Curtis J. Rowe was from Hilliard, Ohio and was a member of the Civil Air Patrol for more than three decades.

Investigation 

On the day of the crash, both the Federal Aviation Administration (FAA) and the National Transportation Safety Board (NTSB) launched investigations into the accident. On November 14, the NTSB announced that the wreckage of the P-63 had been moved to a "secure location," while the recovery of the B-17 wreckage was delayed by rain. The NTSB confirmed that neither aircraft was equipped with a flight data recorder, but that a GPS navigator from the P-63 and an electronic flight display from the B-17 had been recovered and were being taken to an NTSB laboratory in Washington, D.C. to be processed for "data and relevant information."

On November 30, the NTSB released a preliminary report. The report noted the lack of "altitude deconflictions briefed before the flight or while the airplanes were in the air." That is, the aircraft were allowed to operate at the same altitude. The report also noted that the GPS navigator in the P-63 did not record any information during the flight. On January 12, 2023, the ATC audio was released. No altitude advice was given.

The P-63F involved in the accident was known to have compromised visibility from the cockpit due to metal reinforcements; however, the wings are set further back from the cockpit compared to a P-51 Mustang, so a pilot would have better ventral visibility.

Public response 
Several Texas officials reacted publicly to the crash. Dallas County Judge Clay Jenkins said on Twitter, "My heart goes out to all the individuals & families affected by the horrible tragedy at the Wings Over Dallas air show today. Please join me in praying for all." Dallas Mayor Eric Johnson called the accident "a terrible tragedy in our city." The president of the Commemorative Air Force, which organized the show, said that this kind of mid-air collision during an airshow was "extremely rare."

References

External links

 
 
 
 
 
 Air Traffic Control audio via FAA.gov (event at approximately 22:00 mark)

2022 in Texas
Airshow
Aviation accidents and incidents in the United States in 2022
Aviation accidents and incidents in Texas
Aviation accidents and incidents involving the Boeing B-17 Flying Fortress
Aviation accidents and incidents at air shows
Accidents and incidents involving military aircraft
Disasters in Texas
Filmed deaths in the United States
Mid-air collisions involving military aircraft
November 2022 events in the United States